Vateria is a genus of plants in the family Dipterocarpaceae.

Species
It contains the following species (but this list may be incomplete):
 Vateria acuminata Hayne
 Vateria copallifera (Retz.) Alston
 Vateria indica Linn
 Vateria macrocarpa B.L. Gupta

References

 
Malvales genera
Taxonomy articles created by Polbot